The Shenyang Olympic Sports Center Stadium is a 60,000-seat multi-purpose stadium in Shenyang, Liaoning, China.

Nicknamed "Crystal Crown" 水晶皇冠, the stadium was built by AXS Satow as a replacement for Wulihe Stadium. It hosted football matches at the 2008 Summer Olympics. It was the home ground of the Shenyang Dongjin F.C., a club that folded in 2018. In 2013 the stadium was the principal venue of the 2013 National Games of China with the opening and closing ceremonies as well as the main athletic events.

The complex includes a 10,000-seat gymnasium, a 4,000-seat natatorium, and a 4,000-seat tennis field.

External links
 Beijing Olympics 2008 official website
 Liaoning 2013 China's Twelfth National Games official website

References

Buildings and structures in Shenyang
Sport in Shenyang
Football venues in China
Athletics (track and field) venues in China
Venues of the 2008 Summer Olympics
Olympic football venues
Multi-purpose stadiums in China
Sports venues in Liaoning
Sports venues completed in 2007